Coprophilia (from Greek κόπρος, kópros 'excrement' and φιλία, philía 'liking, fondness'), also called scatophilia or scat (Greek: σκατά, skatá 'feces'), is the paraphilia involving sexual arousal and pleasure from feces.

Research 
In the Diagnostic and Statistical Manual of Mental Disorders (DSM), published by the American Psychiatric Association, it is classified under 302.89—Paraphilia NOS (Not Otherwise Specified) and has no diagnostic criteria other than a general statement about paraphilias that says "the diagnosis is made if the behavior, sexual urges, or fantasies cause clinically significant distress or impairment in social, occupational, or other important areas of functioning".  Furthermore, the DSM-IV-TR notes, "Fantasies, behaviors, or objects are paraphilic only when they lead to clinically significant distress or impairment (e.g. are obligatory, result in sexual dysfunction, require participation of nonconsenting individuals, lead to legal complications, interfere with social relationships)".

Although there may be no connection between coprophilia and sadomasochism (SM), the limited data on the former comes from studies of the latter. A 1999 study of 164 males in Finland from two SM clubs found that 18.2% had engaged in coprophilia; 3% as a sadist only, 6.1% as a masochist only, and 9.1% as both.  In the study pool 18% of heterosexuals and 17% of homosexuals had tried coprophilia, showing no statistically significant difference between heterosexuals and homosexuals. In a separate article analyzing 12 men who engaged in bestiality, an additional analysis of an 11-man subgroup revealed that six had engaged in coprophilic behavior, compared with only one in the matched control group consisting of 12 SM-oriented males who did not engage in bestiality.

Society and culture 

American musician Chuck Berry recorded videos of himself urinating on and engaging in coprophilia with women. In one video, a woman defecates on him after he says "Now it's time for my breakfast." He was also sued for videotaping dozens of women in the restroom of a restaurant he owned, which has been identified as being motivated by his coprophilia fetish.

The Cleveland steamer is a colloquial term for a form of coprophilia, where someone defecates on their partner's chest. The term received news attention through its use in a U.S. Congress staff hoax email and being addressed by the United States Federal Communications Commission.

 Hot Karl (also Hot Sasser) is sexual slang referring to one of several purported acts involving feces. It variously means an act of defecating on one's sexual partner, defecating on someone who is asleep, or defecating on someone's face while covered in plastic wrap. According to psychologist Anil Aggrawal, it is a synonym for a Cleveland steamer and is part of a coprophilia vocabulary that also includes the Dirty Sanchez. The term was adopted as a name by rapper Hot Karl.

 Dirty Sanchez is a purported sex act which consists of feces purposely being smeared onto a partner's upper lip. Sex-advice columnist Dan Savage dismissed the act as completely fictional.  Brian Bouldrey in Dirty Words: A Literary Encyclopedia of Sex says the act is an urban legend. The New Partridge Dictionary of Slang and Unconventional English says, "This appears to have been contrived with the intention to provoke shock rather than actually as a practice, although, no doubt, some have or will experiment." Columnist Gustavo Arellano of ¡Ask a Mexican! contends the term evokes the stereotypical mustache of a Mexican. The term for the sex act entered British gay cant Polari in the 1960s.

 A Chicago sunroof is a fictional act, popularized in American crime drama series Better Call Saul, a spinoff of Breaking Bad. In the series, the titular character Jimmy McGill (Bob Odenkirk) defecates through an open sunroof as part of a revenge plan. As he (falsely) points out, “It's a real thing. I didn't make it up. I'm not the first person to do it. There's a name for it.” Series creator Peter Gould clarified in an interview that the "Chicago sunroof" is not real.

See also
 2 Girls 1 Cup
 Anilingus
 Ass to mouth—removing the penis from the passive partner's anus followed by its immediate insertion into either their mouth, or another person's.
 Coprophagia—the consumption of feces
 Flatulence fetishism
 Sadomasochism
 Scatology
 Urolagnia (also known as urophilia)—a paraphilia involving sexual pleasure from urine

References

Further reading

External links 
 
 
 

Feces
Paraphilias
Sexual acts